David Shaw (born April 11, 1953 in Mountain Home, Idaho) was a football player in the Canadian Football League for twelve years. Shaw played defensive back for the Hamilton Tiger-Cats and Winnipeg Blue Bombers from 1975-1986. He was a CFL All-Star five times and was a part of the Blue Bombers Grey Cup championship team in 1984. He played college football at the Prairie View A&M University.

References

1953 births
Living people
American players of Canadian football
Canadian football defensive backs
Hamilton Tiger-Cats players
People from Mountain Home, Idaho
Players of American football from Idaho
Prairie View A&M Panthers football players
Winnipeg Blue Bombers players